The Tauhara Power Station is a geothermal power station north of Taupo in New Zealand. Previously known as Tauhara 2, the project is being developed by Contact Energy and Tauhara Moana Trust and is expected to be fully operational by late 2023.

Background
Stage 1 of the wider Tauhara project is operational as the Te Huka Power Station.  This is a 23 MW binary plant supplied with geothermal steam from the Tauhara field.

Tauhara Stage 2
The application for resource consents for a 250 MW power station was submitted in February 2010.  The Minister for the Environment determined that this project was one of national significance, and referred it to an independent Board of Inquiry.  The resource consents were granted in December 2010.  It was the first infrastructure project to be processed under the new Board of Inquiry process administered by the Environmental Protection Authority.  In August 2019 Contact Energy began drilling four wells to further characterize the geothermal reservoir on the field and inform a final decision on whether to build a new power plant.

The project is expected to cost around $580 million.

In February 2021 Contact Energy announced that it planned to issue $400 million of new shares to raise capital to build the plant.

Construction of the station began in March 2021 In February 2022 Contact announced that the completion date would be delayed to mid-2023, but that the output of the station would increase to 168MW.

See also

 Geothermal power in New Zealand
 List of power stations in New Zealand

References

External links
Contact Energy - Tauhara Power Station

Geothermal power stations in New Zealand
Taupō
Buildings and structures in the Taupo District